Valentine Tessier (5 August 1892 – 11 August 1981) was a French actress who appeared in around thirty films during her career. She played the title role in Jean Renoir's 1934 film version of Madame Bovary.

Selected filmography
 The Italian Straw Hat (1928)
 Madame Bovary (1934)
 Women's Club (1936)
 Ménilmontant (1936)
 Abused Confidence (1938)
 The Phantom Carriage (1939)
 Le Lit à colonnes (1942)
 Distress (1946)
 Justice Is Done (1950)
 The Temptress (1952)
 Leathernose (1952)
 Lucrèce Borgia (1953)
 Children of Love (1953)
 Stain in the Snow (1954)
 Maddalena (1954)
 The Hunchback of Notre Dame (1956)
 Maigret et l'Affaire Saint-Fiacre (1959)

References

Bibliography
 Donaldson-Evans, Mary. Madame Bovary at the Movies: Adaptation, Ideology, Context. Rodopi, 2009.

External links

1892 births
1981 deaths
French film actresses
French silent film actresses
Actresses from Paris
20th-century French actresses